Colleen M. Fitzpatrick (born April 25, 1955) is an American  forensic scientist, genealogist and entrepreneur.  She helped identify remains found in the crash site of Northwest Flight 4422, that crashed in Alaska in 1948, and co-founded the DNA Doe Project which identifies previously unidentified bodies and runs Identifinders International, an investigative genetic genealogy consulting firm which helps identify victims and perpetrators of violent crimes.

Early life and education
Colleen M. Fitzpatrick was born April 25, 1955 in New Orleans, Louisiana. She received her BA in physics (1976) from Rice University, and her MA (1983) and PhD in nuclear physics (1983) from Duke University.

Career
She lectured at Sam Houston University for two years, before working on a laser radar system at Rockwell International and then high resolution optical measurement techniques at Spectron Development Laboratories. She then founded, in her garage in 1986, Rice Systems, an optics company that did contract research and development. Her company grew to employ seven scientists but closed in 2005 after NASA dropped the spaceship to Jupiter project on which the company had been working.

Forensic genealogy 
Fitzpatrick had started writing a book about forensic genealogy in 2002, and after no publishers would accept it, she self-published the book in 2005. She started selling her book at genealogy conferences.  She set up a corresponding website, and started writing columns on the topic for magazines and websites.  In 2006, Hebron Investments asked her to find a missing person because someone wanted to buy land, but the title owner could not be found.  This led to her trying to locate owners of unclaimed property in 75 cases (of which she found 73) in 30 countries.

Her next venture, Identifinders International, founded with her late partner Andy Yeiser (an engineering and business management consultant), she uses the techniques of forensic genealogy to identify victims and perpetrators of violent crimes, as well as Jane/John Doe cases where the body has been left unidentified for as long as decades sometimes. In 2007 she helped identify the body of a child about two years old that died in the 1912 Titanic disaster as Sidney Leslie Goodwin from England, aged 19 months, whose family had died in the wreck and had relatives in New Zealand. In 2008 she helped identify the remains found in the wreckage of Northwest Flight 4422 that crashed in Alaska in 1948. That same year she helped expose Misha Defonseca's book "Misha: A Memoire of the Holocaust Years" as a fraud. Fitzpatrick and Sharon Sergeant also exposed as a fraud Herman Rosenblat's book Angel at the Fence (which claimed to be about Rosenblat's holocaust survival). In 2020, Dr. Fitzpatrick of Identifinders International and The Porchlight Project helped Ohio police identify James Zastawnick as a suspect in the 1987 murder by strangulation of 17-year-old Barbara Blatnik.

In 2014, Fitzpatrick helped police narrow down the list of suspects to five men with the surname Miller for the murder in Phoenix, Arizona of Angela Brosso, 22, in 1992, and the murder of Melanie Bernas, 17, in 1993 ("The Canal Killer"). Police found there was only one possibility and DNA testing confirmed that Bryan Patrick Miller matched DNA from the killer. In 2015 Miller was arrested and charged with the two murders. Miller had been a suspect at the time of the murders, but released for lack of evidence. Miller was also later charged with the 2012 murder of 13-year-old Briana Naylor. Fitzpatrick believes this was the first cold case solved by genetic genealogy.

In 2015 Fitzpatrick, Cece Moore and a team of adoption researchers helped Benjaman Kyle, an amnesiac since 2004, find his identity (William Burgess Powell) and family members.

In 2016, Fitzpatrick played a role in establishing the true identity of Lori Erica Ruff, a woman who had assumed a false identity in 1988 and committed suicide in 2010, after which her husband's family discovered she had stolen the identity of a deceased child. Ruff turned out to be Kimberly McLean, who had severed all ties with her family and adopted a new identity to avoid being located by them.

In 2018 and 2019, she helped Rapid City, South Dakota police with the case of the rape and murder by strangulation of 60-year-old Gwen Miller in 1968. Using Y-DNA, Fitzpatrick narrowed the possible suspects down to 6-7 men with the surname Field. Local police were then able to identify Eugene Field as the prime suspect. Field had already died in 2009 from cancer.

In 2020 she helped Orange County, California police identify the body of a young woman who had been found in 1968 beaten, raped and her throat cut near Huntington Beach as 26-year-old Anita Louise Piteau.

DNA Doe Project 
In 2017 she co-founded with Margaret Press the DNA Doe Project which has the aim of identifying dead adults for their families (they avoid investigating dead children because the mothers of such children might be very young themselves and might be victims of incest or rape). In June 2020 she resigned from the project.

Their first success in 2018 was identifying the dead "Buckskin Girl" in Ohio as belonging to Marcia King from Arkansas. They also identified the bodies of "Lyle Stevik", "Joseph Newton Chandler III" (Robert Nichols), "Alfred Jake Fuller", "Anaheim Jane Doe" (Tracey Hobson) and "Washoe County or Sheep Flats Jane Doe" in 2018 (Mary Silvani).

In 2019, they identified the bodies of "Lavender Doe" (Dana Dodd),  "Rock County John Doe," "Butler County Jane Doe" (Darlene Wilson Norcross), "Annie Doe" (Anne Marie Lehman), “Vicky Dana Jane Doe” (Dana Nicole Lowrey), "Belle in the Well" (Louise Virginia Peterson Flesher), "Orange Socks" (Debra Jackson), "I-96 Jane Doe" (Marcia Kaylynn Bateman), the "Mill Creek Shed Man" (Nathaniel Terrence Deggs), "Phoenix Jane Doe" (Bertha Alicia Holguín Barroterán),  "Marion County Jane Doe" (Michelle E. Carnall-Burton), "Barron County John Doe" (William “Billy” Arthur Fiegener) and "Clark County John Doe", the remains of a headless man in an Idaho cave identified as a suspected murderer (Joseph Henry Loveless) who had died about 100 years before, probably in 1916.

In 2020, her team identified  the bodies of "Barron County John Doe" (Kraig Patrick King), the "Corona Girl" (Sue Ann Huskey), "Peoria County John Doe" (John H. Frisch, Jr.), the "Lime Lady" (Tamara Lee Tigard). and a Jane Doe in Phoenix, Arizona (Ginger Lynn Bibb)  and was involved in the identification of Joseph Augustus Zarelli.

Professional associations 
She is a Fellow of the Society of Photo-Optical Instrumentation Engineers (SPIE) and an Associate Member of the American Academy of Forensic Science. In 2021, Dr. Fitzpatrick was made a full member of the Vidocq Society, make her one of 82 full members, a number set by the society's charter.

Selected works

Books
Forensic Genealogy, with Andrew Yeiser, Fountain Valley, CA: Rice Book Press, 2005. 
DNA and Genealogy, with Andrew Yeiser, Fountain Valley, CA: Rice Book Press, 2005. 
The Dead Horse Investigation: Forensic Photo Analysis for Everyone, Fountain Valley, CA: Rice Book Press, 2008. 
The DNA Detective,

Book chapters

See also
CeCe Moore

References

External links
 

1955 births
American genealogists
American forensic scientists
Duke University alumni
Living people
Rice University alumni
Colleen
Women forensic scientists
American women historians
SPIE